The toothed seadevil, spiny seadevil or netbeard seadevil, (Neoceratias spinifer), is a rarely seen deep-sea anglerfish found in the mesopelagic and bathypelagic zones of the western central Pacific Ocean. It is the only species in the family Neoceratidae, and is unique amongst the deep-sea anglerfish in lacking an illicium and esca (the "fishing rod" and "lure"), and in having large teeth placed on the outside of its jaws.

Description
They are dark red-brown to black in color, with naked skin. The mouth is large and extends well past the small eye; the jaws have an inner row of short, straight, widely spaced, immobile teeth. On the outside of the jaws, there are prominent conical outgrowths that bear 2-3 straight teeth, the longest of which reach almost 15% the length of the entire body. Each of these teeth is hinged at the base, with well-developed musculature and a tiny hook at the end. The illicium, or lure, is absent, along with the trough in which it rests in other deep-sea anglerfishes. There are a pair of prominent nasal papillae on the snout; nostrils and olfactory lamellae are absent.

Both the males and larvae differ from other deep-sea anglerfish in having slender bodies. Mature males are only known from parasitic specimens already attached to the females. The largest known specimen is 18 mm long. They are lighter in color than the females and have semitranslucent skin. They are attached to the females by outgrowths of the snout and lower jaw; the olfactory organs are absent and the eyes are degenerate and covered with skin. The larvae are 4–10 mm long, with well-developed olfactory organs and no sexual dimorphism.

Biology
With no bioluminescent lure and an unusual tooth arrangement, it is unclear what the toothed seadevil feeds upon and how. It has been suggested that their external jaw teeth serve to entangle soft-bodied invertebrates. The males are fully parasitic, using tooth-bearing denticles at the tips of their jaws to attach to the female and their tissues and blood vessels becoming fused with that of the female.

References

Lophiiformes
Fish described in 1914